The Wasserstrom Company is a restaurant supplier based in Columbus, Ohio with distribution centers located across North America. The Wasserstrom Company is a family-owned and operated business that was founded in 1902 by Nathan Wasserstrom. The company is currently one of the largest distributors of foodservice products, specializing in restaurant supplies.

References

External links
 

Distribution companies of the United States
Companies based in the Columbus, Ohio metropolitan area